Peter W. Prebble (born September 13, 1950) is a Canadian politician and environmentalist. He was an elected representative in the Legislative Assembly of Saskatchewan for 16 years between 1978 and 2007 and has been a longtime member of the Saskatchewan Environmental Society.

Early life and education 
Prebble was born in Essex, England, the son of Reginald Allen Prebble. He holds two Master's degrees from the University of Saskatchewan, one in Sustainable Environmental Management and one in Education.

Political career 
Prebble had a long career as a New Democratic Party member of the Saskatchewan legislature, representing the constituencies of Saskatoon Sutherland from 1978 to 1982, Saskatoon University from 1986 to 1991 and Saskatoon Greystone from 1999 to 2007. Prebble staked a claim as the "comeback kid" of Saskatchewan provincial politics, returning to the legislature after losing his seat on two occasions and unsuccessfully attempting a comeback out of retirement in 2011.

Prebble was first elected in the 1978 provincial election in Saskatoon Sutherland. In the 1982 election he ran for re-election in the neighbouring district of Saskatoon University, but was defeated by Rick Folk of the Progressive Conservatives. He ran again in the 1986 election, defeating Folk. After that riding was dissolved ahead of the 1991 election, Prebble ran in the new district of Saskatoon Greystone that year, but was defeated by Liberal Party leader Lynda Haverstock.

He did not run in the 1995 election. Following Haverstock's retirement, however, Prebble was re-elected in the 1999 election and served the district for two terms before retiring ahead of the 2007 election.

Prebble held a number of cabinet positions during his time in the legislature, and he acted as the Legislative Secretary for Renewable Energy and Energy Conservation in from 2006-2007. In this role he authored "Renewable Energy Development and Conservation in Saskatchewan," also known as the Prebble Report, which advanced dozens of recommendations on expanding energy conservation and renewable energy development in the province.

He was encouraged to come out of retirement to run in Saskatoon Greystone again in the 2011 election. He did so, citing his concerns about the dismantling of environmental programs by the new Saskatchewan Party government and stating that he was "determined to reverse these decisions and... to build a renewable energy future in the province." However, Prebble lost to incumbent Rob Norris.

Post politics 
From 2012 to 2016 Prebble was the Director of Environmental Policy for the Saskatchewan Environmental Society (SES), a role in which he authored and co-authored numerous reports and articles on climate and energy policy. He remains a Board Member with SES. He also served as the President of the Board for the SES Solar Coop.

References

External links 
 Saskatchewan Environmental Society Board

Living people
1950 births
Saskatchewan New Democratic Party MLAs
Politicians from Saskatoon
21st-century Canadian politicians